A utility tunnel, utility corridor, or utilidor is a passage built underground or above ground to carry utility lines such as electricity, steam, water supply pipes, and sewer pipes. Communications utilities like fiber optics, cable television, and telephone cables are also sometimes carried. One may also be referred to as a services tunnel, services trench, services vault, or cable vault. Smaller cable containment is often referred to as a cable duct or underground conduit. Direct-buried cable is a major alternative to ducts or tunnels.

Usage
They are also built in places where the water table is too high to bury water and sewer mains, and where utility poles would be too unsightly or pose a danger (like in earthquake prone Tokyo). Tunnels are also built to avoid the disruption caused by recurring construction, repair and upgrading of cables and pipes in direct burial trenches.

Utility tunnels are also often common on large industrial, institutional, or commercial sites, where multiple large-scale services infrastructure (gas, water, power, heat, steam, compressed air, telecommunications cable, etc.) are distributed around the site to multiple buildings, without impeding vehicular or pedestrian traffic above ground. Due to the nature of these services, they may require regular inspection, repair, maintenance, or replacement, and therefore accessible utility tunnels are preferred instead of direct burying of the services in the ground.

Utility tunnels range in size from just large enough to accommodate the utility being carried, to very large tunnels that can also accommodate human and even vehicular traffic.

Industrial, institutional, and municipal environments

Utility tunnels are often installed in large industrial plants, as well as large institutions, such as universities, hospitals, research labs, and other facilities managed in common.  Shared facilities, such as district heating, use superheated steam pipes routed through utility tunnels.  On some university campuses, such as the Massachusetts Institute of Technology, many of the buildings are connected via large underground passages to allow easy movement of people and equipment.

Some municipalities, such as Prague in the Czech Republic, have installed extensive underground utility tunnels, to allow installation and maintenance of utility lines and equipment without disrupting the historic streets above.

Utility tunnels may attract urban explorers, who enjoy investigating hidden complex networks of spaces.

At Walt Disney World

Some of the largest and most famous utility tunnels are at Disney theme parks. They were first built for Walt Disney World's Magic Kingdom in Florida. Smaller utilidor systems are built under the central section of Epcot's Future World, primarily beneath Spaceship Earth and Innoventions, and formerly at Pleasure Island. Disneyland also has a small utilidor through Tomorrowland. The utilidors are a part of Disney's "backstage" (behind-the-scenes) area. They allow Disney employees ("cast members") to perform park support operations, such as trash removal, out of the sight of guests.

Arctic towns

Utilidors are above-ground enclosed utility conduits that are used in larger communities in the northern polar region where permafrost does not allow the normal practice of burying water and sewer pipes underground. They can in particular be found in Inuvik, Northwest Territories and Iqaluit, Nunavut. Not all older homes are connected, and these must rely on trucks to deliver water and remove sewage. Most homes in rural Alaska (off the road system) are not equipped with plumbing and require fresh water and waste to be transported by personal vehicle such as snowmobile or four-wheeler ATV. Villages with utilidors are considered more advanced.

Utilidors may also be used to carry fuel lines, such as natural gas. They are not normally used to carry wiring for electric, telephone, and television service, which are usually suspended from poles.

Comparison with direct burial of utilities

The advantages of utility tunnels are the reduction of maintenance manholes, one-time relocation, and less excavation and repair, compared to separate cable ducts for each service.  When they are well mapped, they also allow rapid access to all utilities without having to dig access trenches or resort to confused and often inaccurate utility maps.

One of the greatest advantages is public safety.  Underground power lines, whether in common or separate channels, prevent downed utility cables from blocking roads, thus speeding emergency access after natural disasters such as earthquakes, hurricanes, and tsunamis.

The following table compares the features of utility networks in single purpose buried trenches vs. the features of common ducts or tunnels:

Examples 
Many examples of utility tunnels are found in Japan, where government officials have sought ways to reduce the catastrophic effects of earthquakes in their tectonically active country. Their use, however, is not limited to that country, and there are many examples of such utility tunnels. These include:
 Incorporated with Xinyi and Sonshan MRT rapid transit lines in Taipei, Taiwan.
 Azabu-Hibiya Common Utility Duct in Tokyo, Japan
 Minatomirai District lines in Yokohama, Japan
 Portions of the Chicago Tunnel Company's abandoned network of tunnels are leased to utility companies for use as common utility ducts for electrical, communication and HVAC lines.  The tunnels lie approximately forty feet below the street surface and run under all streets in the central business district, except where they were displaced by rapid transit tunnels.
 Poundbury in Dorset, England, a planned community built on land belonging to King Charles as Duke of Cornwall, incorporates common utility ducts
 Bremen, Germany has near-perfect surfaces on its footways, cycleways, and streets, with virtually no visible repairs or disturbances. This is achieved by an absence of vehicles on footways or cycleways, and utility ducts that make it is unnecessary to disturb the surfaces in order to access the networks. Utility networks are housed in a cluster of pipes which are located under footways and cycleways.
 The Dartford Cable Tunnel allows high voltage electricity line to cross the River Thames.
 The Utility Tunnels in Qatar built on the Lusail, 15 km north of Doha, is approximately 14–15 km in length.
 The old Beacon Hill Tunnel in New Kowloon, Hong Kong, a disused railway tunnel which now carries a towngas pipeline
 Tunnels of Hongkong Electric
 Utility Tunnel in GIFT City, Gandhinagar, India

Gallery

See also

Dartford Cable Tunnel
Tunnel
Underground city
Utility vault

References

Tunnels
Subterranea (geography)